Delta is a DVD by Australian singer-songwriter Delta Goodrem. It was released on 13 October 2003 through Sony. In some international markets it was titled Innocent Eyes. The DVD features a collection of highlights documenting the Innocent Eyes era.  It spent eight weeks at #1 and has become the highest selling music DVD in Australia by an Australian artist, being certified platinum twelve times. It was awarded "Best Music DVD" at the 3rd Annual Australian DVD Awards.

Track listing
Live performances
"Will You Fall For Me" (Channel [V] HQ)
"Not Me, Not I" (Channel [V] HQ)
"Born to Try" (Channel [V] HQ)[A] 
"Throw It Away" (Channel [V] HQ) 
"Predictable" (Channel [V] HQ)
"Lost Without You" (Channel [V] HQ)
"Innocent Eyes" (Channel [V] HQ)
"Butterfly" (Channel [V] HQ) 
London Showcase (January 2003) 
"Born to Try" (Channel 7 Bali Appeal)[A] 
"Not Me, Not I' (Channel [V] Music Bus - Luna Park Melbourne)[A] 
"Born to Try" (Celebrate - Christmas in the Capital)

Music videos
"Born to Try"
"Lost Without You"
"Innocent Eyes"
"Not Me, Not I"
"A Year Ago Today"[B] 
"I Don't Care"

Behind the scenes
"Born to Try"
"Lost Without You"
"Innocent Eyes"
"Not Me, Not I"
London (January 2003)
Europe (May 2003)
Live at Channel [V] HQ 
Photo shoots

Growing up
Performing
Sport

Extras
EPK
Outtakes 
Photo gallery

Notes
 A ^Not featured on international release.
 B ^Previously unreleased.

Charts

Weekly charts

Year-end charts

Certifications

References 

Delta Goodrem video albums
2003 live albums
2003 video albums
2003 compilation albums
Live video albums
Music video compilation albums